Uncial 030, designated by siglum U or 030 (in the Gregory-Aland numbering), ε 90 (von Soden), is a Greek uncial manuscript of the New Testament on parchment, dated palaeographically to the 9th century. The manuscript has complex contents, with full marginalia (see picture). 

The text of the codex usually follows the majority text, but with departures, some of them represent Alexandrian tradition. The manuscript is rarely cited in the present critical editions of the Greek New Testament.

Description 
The codex contains 291 parchment leaves, with a complete text of the four Gospels. The leaves are arranged in quarto (four leaves in quire). The text is written in two columns per page, and 21 lines per column, in brown ink. According to Scrivener the manuscript is carefully and luxury written.
The ornaments are in gold and colours.

The initial letters in gold and decorated. The letters are high, and round. They have breathings and accents.

It is an ornamented codex, with full marginalia, as well illuminations such as pictures and golden ornaments. It is written in well rounded uncials, Letters are in general an imitation of those used before the introduction of compressed uncials. The letters are compressed only at the end of line. It is shown in Tregelles' facsimile, the oblong omicrons creep at the end of lines 2 and 4. Samuel Prideaux Tregelles found that the "letters are in general an imitation of those used before the introduction of compressed uncials; but they do not belong to the age when full and round writing was customary or natural, so that the stiffness and want of ease is manifest".

There is also another division according to the smaller Ammonian Sections, with references to the Eusebian Canons. Number of sections in Gospel of Mark is 233 (usual is 235), the last section in 16:8.

Before Gospel of Mark it has picture with the baptism of Jesus; before Gospel of John it has picture with the rays from the clouds, John stands, and Prochorus writes.

Text of the codex

Text type 
The Greek text of this codex is a representative of the Byzantine text-type. The non-Byzantine readings are confirmed by Codex Monacensis and minuscule 1071, though there is no real reason to think they are related.

The manuscript stands in some relationship to the Codex Basilensis and other textual members of the textual family Family E, but Nanianus does not belong to this family.

Hermann von Soden classified its text to his textual group Io which refers to nine manuscripts in Luke. They do not form a group. According to Soden textual group Io, is a result of recension Pamphilus from Caeasarea (ca. 300 AD). Aland placed it in Category V, though it is not pure the Byzantine text, with a number non-Byzantine readings.

According to the Claremont Profile Method it represents textual family Kx in Luke 10, in Luke 1 and Luke 20 it has mixed Byzantine text. It is close to minuscules 974 and 1006 in Luke 1 and Luke 10.

The manuscript contains the texts of the Signs of the times (Matthew 16:2b-3), Christ's agony at Gethsemane (Luke 22:43-44), John 5:3.4, and the Pericope Adulterae (John 7:53-8:11) without any mark, which are considered inauthentic in the modern Critical editions. It contains the longer ending of Mark (16:9-20), but there is not the Ammonian Sections and Eusebian Canons at the margin. In text of Pericope Adulterae it has several peculiar readings (see section below), some of them has textual affinities with Codex Tischendorfianus III.

Textual variants

Pericope Adulterae 
In John 8:2 after οφθρου δε παλιν it has reading βαθεος ελθεν ο Ιησους instead of παρεγενετο.

In John 8:4 it reads ειπον (said) for λεγουσι (say); the reading is supported by Codex Tischendorfianus III.

In John 8:7 it reads αναβλεψας instead of ανακυψας or ανεκυψεν, along with Tischendorfianus III, manuscripts of Ferrar Group (f13), and 700.

In John 8:8 the codex represents unique textual addition: ενος εκαστου αυτων τας αμαρτιας (sins of every one of them). This textual variant is supported by the manuscripts: Minuscule 73, 95, 331, 364, 413, 658, 700, 782, 1592, and some Armenian manuscripts. Minuscule 652 has this variant on the margin added by a later hand. Minuscule 264 has this textual variant in John 8:6.

In John 8:10a it reads Ιησους ειδεν αυτην και against reading: Ιησους και μηδενα θεασαμενος πλην της γυναικος, and reading: Ιησους. The reading of the codex is supported by the manuscripts: Tischendorfianus III, manuscripts of f13, 225, 700, 1077, 1443, Lectionary 185mg, and Ethiopic manuscripts.

In John 8:10b it reads που εισιν οι κατηγοροι σου along with manuscripts: Seidelianus I, Vaticanus 354, manuscripts of Ferrar Family (f13), 28, 225, 700, 1009, instead of που εισιν [εκεινοι] οι κατηγοροι σου as manuscripts Basilensis, Boreelianus, Seidelianus I, Cyprius, 1079, or που εισιν as manuscripts Bezae, Campianus, Tischendorfianus IV, Tischendorfianus III, and manuscripts of Lake's Family (f1).

In John 8:11 it reads ειπεν δε αυτη ο Ιησους against reading ο δε Ιησους ειπεν αυτη or ειπεν δε ο Ιησους; the reading of the codex is supported by codices Tischendorfianus IV and minuscule 700.

Alexandrian readings 
In Matthew 2:15 – the same in Matthew 2:17 – it reads υπο του κυριου for υπο κυριου; the reading of the manuscript is supported by codices: Sinaiticus (א), Vaticanus (B), Ephraemi (C), Bezae (D), Dublinensis, Tischendorfianus IV, Sangallensis, Petropolitanus, the reading υπο κυριου is supported by Basilensis, Cyprius, Regius, Campianus, Vaticanus 354, U, Mosquensis II.

In Matthew 27:49 it has Alexandrian interpolation ἄλλος δὲ λαβὼν λόγχην ἒνυξεν αὐτοῦ τὴν πλευράν, καὶ ἐξῆλθεν ὖδορ καὶ αἳμα (the other took a spear and pierced His side, and immediately came out water and blood), this reading was derived from John 19:34 – it is found in Codex Sinaiticus, Vaticanus, Ephraemi Rescriptus, Regius, Tischendorfianus IV, 1010, 1293, syrpal, ethmss.

In John 1:29 ο Ιωαννης is omitted, as in Alexandrian and old Byzantine manuscripts.

In John 2:13 it has reading ο Ιησους εις Ιεροσολυμα (Jesus to Jerusalem), majority of manuscripts has order εις Ιεροσολυμα ο Ιησους (to Jerusalem Jesus); the reading of the codex is supported by the manuscripts: Papyrus 66, Papyrus 75, Codex Seidelianus I, Codex Regius, Campianus, Petropolitanus Purpureus, Uncial 0211, 1010 1505, lectionary 425, lectionary 640, and several other manuscripts.

In John 4:35 it reads ετι τετραμενος εστι, majority of the manuscripts has τετραμενος εστι.

In John 5:5 it reads τριακοντα και οκτω ετη (thirty and eight years) as in Alexandrian manuscripts, majority reads τριακονταοκτω ετη (thirty eight years). Word εχων after ετη is omitted.

In John 5:16 phrase οι Ιουδαιοι τον Ιησουν has Alexandrian sequence of words, the majority has τον Ιησουν οι Ιουδαιοι.

In John 5:44 it reads αλληλων as in Alexandrian manuscripts, majority reads ανθρωπων.

In John 6:40 it reads τουτο γαρ as Alexandrian manuscripts, majority reads τουτο δε.

In John 6:54 it has reading καγω αναστησω as Alexandrian manuscripts, majority reads και εγω αναστησω.

In John 7:8 it reads ο εμος καιρος as Alexandrian manuscripts, majority has ο καιρος ο εμος.

Other readings 

In Matthew 8:13 it has interpolation και υποστρεψας ο εκατονταρχος εις τον οικον αυτου εν αυτη τη ωρα ευρεν τον παιδα υγιαινοντα (and when the centurion returned to the house in that hour, he found the slave well). Sinaiticus, Ephraemi, Basilensis (with asterisk), Campianus, (Petropolitanus Purpureus), Koridethi, (0250), f1, (33, 1241), g1, syrh.

In John 2:1 it reads τριτη ημερα (third day) for ημερα τη τριτη (the third day); the reading is supported by the manuscripts: Vaticanus, Koridethi, manuscripts of Ferrar Family, minuscule 196, minuscule 743.

In John 2:3 it has unique reading λεγει η μητηρ αυτου προς αυτον (his mother said to him), all other manuscripts have λεγει η μητηρ του Ιησου προς αυτον (mother of Jesus said to him).

In John 3:2 it reads προς αυτον (to him), majority of manuscripts have προς τον Ιησουν (to Jesus); the reading of the codex is supported by Sinaiticus, Alexandrinus, Vaticanus, Cyprius, Regius, Vaticanus 354, Macedoniensis, Sangallensis, Koridethi, Tischendorfianus III, Petropolitanus, Atous Lavrensis, Athous Dionysiou, Uncial 047, Uncial 0211, Minuscule 7, 9, 461, 565.

In John 3:34 it has unique reading εκ μερους (by part) instead of εκ μετρου (by measure); the reading is supported only by minuscule 1505.

In John 4:51 it reads υιος (son) for παις (servant), the reading of the codex is supported by Codex Bezae, Cyprius, Petropolitanus Purpureus, Petropolitanus, 0141, 33, 194, 196, 743, 817, 892, 1192, 1216, 1241.

In John 6:3 phrase ο Ιησους εις το ορος (Jesus on the mountain) has unique sequence of words, other manuscripts have εις το ορος ο Ιησους (on the mountain Jesus).

In John 6:24 it has unique reading εγνω (knew) for ειδεν (saw); it is not supported by other manuscripts.

In John 6:51 it has unique reading περι της του κοσμου ζωης (about the life of the world), other manuscripts have υπερ της του κοσμου ζωης (for the life of the world).

In John 6:67 it has unique reading μαθηταις (disciples), it is supported by Codex Koridethi, other manuscripts have δωδεκα (twelve).

In John 7:17 it has usual reading ποτερον, but corrector changed it into προτερον, the reading is found in minuscules 1216 and 1519.

In John 7:32 it has reading οι αρχιερεις και οι Φαρισαιοι υπηρετας, the reading is supported by manuscripts: Papyrus 75, Vaticanus, Seidelianus I, Cyprius, Regius, Petropolitanus Purpureus, Borgianus, Washingtonianus, Koridethi, Petropolitanus, Athous Lavrensis, 0105, 0141, 9, 565, 1241. Majority of manuscripts has this reading in sequence υπηρετας οι Φαρισαιοι και οι αρχιερεις.

In John 7:34 phrase και οπου ειμι εγω υμεις ου δυνασθε ελθειν is omitted (and where I am you cannot come). This omission is not supported by any examined manuscript.

History 
Andreas Birch dated the manuscript to the 10 or 11th century. Scholz dated it to the 10th century. Scrivener writes that it dates "scarcely before the tenth century, although the letters are in general an imitation of those used before the introduction of compressed uncials". The present palaeographers dated the manuscript to the 9th century. Tregelles and Gregory dated it to the 9th or 10th century.

The codex is named after its last owner, Giovanni Nanni (1432–1502). The codex was described by Giovanni Luigi Mingarelli.

The first collator of the codex was Friedrich Münter (1761–1830), who sent some extracts from the text of the codex to Andreas Birch. Birch used these extracts in his edition of the text of the four Gospels in Greek. Then Birch examined the manuscript himself and gave its description in 1801:
In Bibliotheca Equitis Nanii codex asservatur charactere unciali exaratus Seculo X vel XI, complectens Qvattuor Evangelia cum Eusebii Canonibus. De hoc plura vide in Catalogo Codd. graecorum, qvi apud Nanios asservantur, studio et opera Mingarelli publicatam. Excerpta hujus codicis in adnotationibus hinc inde obvia, mecum communicavit Vir. Cl. Münter, cui etiam debeo notitiam duorum codicum qvi seqvuntur.

It was slightly examined by Scholz. Thomas Hartwell Horne gave this description of the codex:
The Codex Nanianus I., in the library of St. Mark, at Venice, contains the four Gospels with the Eusebian canons. It is nearly entire, and for the most part agrees with the Constantinopolitan recension. Dr. Birch, by whom it was first collated, refers it to the tenth of eleventh century; Dr. Scholz, to the tenth century.

The text of the manuscript was collated by Tischendorf in 1843 and by Tregelles in 1846, thoroughly and independently. They compared their work at Leipzig for the purpose of mutual correction.
Tischendorf cited often the manuscript in his Editio Octava Critica Maior. Gregory saw the manuscript in 1886.

William Hatch published one page of the codex as photographic facsimile in 1939.

Bruce M. Metzger did not describe the manuscript in his The Text of the New Testament… or in Manuscripts of the Greek Bible…, and it one of the very few uncial manuscripts with sigla (01-045) not described by Metzger. It means according to him it has low textual importance. The manuscript is rarely cited in critical editions of the Greek New Testament NA27/UBS4. It is not mentioned in Introduction to the 26th edition of Novum Testamentum Graece of Nestle-Aland. It is often cited in The Gospel According to John in the Byzantine Tradition (2007).

The codex currently is located, in Venice, the Biblioteca Marciana, ms Gr. I, 8 (=1397).

See also 
 List of New Testament uncials
 Textual criticism
 Biblical manuscript

References

Further reading 
 Facsimile
 W. H. P. Hatch, The Principal Uncial Manuscripts of the New Testament (Cambridge 1939), p. LXII (Plate)
 Critical edition of the Greek New Testament
 
  [NA26]
 The Gospel According to John in the Byzantine Tradition (Deutsche Bibelgesellschaft: Stuttgart 2007)

 Related articles
 Russell Champlin, Family E and Its Allies in Matthew (Studies and Documents, XXIII; Salt Lake City, UT, 1967)
 J. Greelings, Family E and Its Allies in Mark (Studies and Documents, XXXI; Salt Lake City, UT, 1968)
 J. Greelings, Family E and Its Allies in Luke (Studies and Documents, XXXV; Salt Lake City, UT, 1968)
 Frederik Wisse, Family E and the Profile Method, Biblica 51, (1970), pp. 67–75

External links 

 Codex Nanianus, U (30): at the Encyclopedia of Textual Criticism

Greek New Testament uncials
9th-century biblical manuscripts